The Texas wolf (Canis lupus monstrabilis) is an extinct subspecies of gray wolf, distinct from the Texas red wolf (Canis rufus), whose range once included southern and western Texas and northeastern Mexico.

Description
It was darker than its more northern cousins, and has a highly arched frontal bone.

Taxonomy
It is recognized as a subspecies of Canis lupus in the taxonomic authority Mammal Species of the World (2005).

References

Wolves in the United States
Extinct canines
Extinct animals of the United States
Extinct animals of Mexico
Subspecies of Canis lupus
Mammals described in 1937
Taxa named by Edward Alphonso Goldman
Species made extinct by deliberate extirpation efforts